Psychic energy may refer to:

 Energy (esotericism), spiritual energy
 Energy (psychological), mental energy